Engineering Geology is a peer reviewed scientific journal published by Elsevier. The journal covers research on engineering geology. The editors-in-chief are G.B. Crosta (University of Milan), R.J. Shlemon (Roy J. Shlemon & Associates Inc., Newport Beach, California), C.H. Juang (Clemson University), C. Carranza-Torres (University of Minnesota Duluth). The journal publishes research papers, case studies and histories, and reviews. The journal was established in 1965.

Abstracting and indexing
This journal is abstracted and indexed in:

According to the 2018 Journal Citation Reports, the journal has a 2017 impact factor of 3.100.

See also
 Quarterly Journal of Engineering Geology & Hydrogeology
 Bulletin of Engineering Geology and the Environment

References

External links 
 

Elsevier academic journals
Engineering journals
Geology journals
English-language journals
Publications established in 1965